Hsieh Su-wei was the defending champion, but decided not to participate.

Shahar Pe'er won the title, defeating Zheng Saisai in the final 6–2, 2–6, 6–3.

Seeds

Main draw

Finals

Top half

Bottom half

References 
 Main draw
 Qualifying draw

Suzhou Ladies Open - Singles
Suzhou Ladies Open